The 2016 Gerry Weber Open was a tennis tournament played on outdoor grass courts. It was the 24th edition of the event and part of the ATP World Tour 500 series of the 2016 ATP World Tour. It took place at the Gerry Weber Stadion in Halle, Germany, between 13 and 19 June 2016.

Points and prize money

Point distribution 

*per player

Prize money 

*per team

Singles main-draw entrants

Seeds 

 1 Rankings are as of June 6, 2016.

Other entrants 
The following players received wildcards into the singles main draw:
  Dustin Brown
  Taylor Fritz
  Jan-Lennard Struff

The following players using a protected ranking into the singles main draw:
  Brian Baker
  Florian Mayer

The following players received entry from the qualifying draw:
  Benjamin Becker
  Ernests Gulbis
  Sergiy Stakhovsky
  Yūichi Sugita

Withdrawals
Before the tournament
  Gaël Monfils →replaced by  Denis Kudla
During the tournament
  Kei Nishikori

Retirements
  Benjamin Becker
  Sergiy Stakhovsky

Doubles main-draw entrants

Seeds 

 Rankings are as of June 6, 2016.

Other entrants
The following pairs received wildcards into the doubles main draw:
  Julian Knowle /  Florian Mayer 
  Alexander Zverev /  Mischa Zverev
The following pair received entry from the qualifying draw:
  Brian Baker /  Denis Istomin
The following pair received entry as lucky losers:
  Santiago González /  Scott Lipsky

Withdrawals
Before the tournament
  Kei Nishikori

Champ

Singles 

  Florian Mayer def.  Alexander Zverev, 6–2, 5–7, 6–3

Doubles 

  Raven Klaasen /  Rajeev Ram vs.  Łukasz Kubot /  Alexander Peya, 7–6(7–5), 6–2

External links 
 Official website